1996 presidential election may refer to:

 1996 United States presidential election
 1996 Russian presidential election
 1996 Armenian presidential election
 1996 Beninese presidential election
 1996 Cape Verdean presidential election
 1996 Chadian presidential election
 1996 Republic of China presidential election
 1996 Comorian presidential election
 1996 Equatorial Guinean presidential election
 1996 Gambian presidential election
 1996 Ghanaian presidential election
 1996 Icelandic presidential election
 1996 Malagasy presidential election
 1996 Nigerien presidential election
 1996 Portuguese presidential election
 1996 Romanian presidential election
 1996 São Tomé and Príncipe presidential election
 1996 Ugandan presidential election
 1996 Zimbabwean presidential election